Epacternis is a genus of snout moths. It was erected by Edward Meyrick in 1933.

Species
 Epacternis alluaudalis Leraut, 2011
 Epacternis flavimedialis (Hampson, 1906)
 Epacternis mabokealis Leraut, 2011
 Epacternis maesalis Leraut, 2011
 Epacternis porphyraspis Meyrick, 1933
 Epacternis pyralis Leraut, 2011

References

Pyralinae
Pyralidae genera
Taxa named by Edward Meyrick